Fort Ste. Anne is a former French military fort located at present-day Englishtown, Nova Scotia, on the Island of Cape Breton, Nova Scotia, Canada.

The fort was built by Captain Charles Daniel (1629) after he raided Baleine. The fort was occupied from 1639 to 1641. Two other military forts were eventually built adjacent to the fort: Simon Denys Fort (1650-1659) and Fort Dauphin (1713-1758).

Fort Dauphin 

After Queen Anne's War, French officer Jean-Baptiste Hertel de Rouville and others established Fort Dauphin in 1713 as the capital of Ile Royale, prior to the establishment of Louisbourg. (Hertel led the Raid on Deerfield and military operations against the English in Newfoundland.)  He played a role in the early settlement of both present-day Englishtown (1719-1722) and St. Peter's (1713-1718).  He died at Fort Dauphin.

As commodore of the fleet, Edward Tyng led 13 armed vessels and about 90 transports in the successful Siege of Louisbourg (1745).  He participated in the Capture of the Vigilant and the destruction of Port Dauphin (Englishtown) in June 1745, burning 40 houses and an equal number of vessels.

Fort Saint Anne is a National Historic Site.

References

External links

Map 1764
History of Nova Scotia
Nova Scotia Forts - Englishtown Forts (broken link 1/9/19)
Port Dauphin Naval Base historic monument at Englishtown

Buildings and structures in Victoria County, Nova Scotia
Military forts in Nova Scotia
Military forts in Acadia
Buildings and structures completed in 1629
1629 establishments in the French colonial empire
1629 establishments in Nova Scotia